Baldinini is an Italy-based brand specialising in luxury shoes in the manufacturing district of Rubicone province of Forlì-Cesena, Italy.

History
The company began in 1910, in the town of San Mauro Pascoli, which is recognised around the world  for its high-quality footwear companies. In the 1970s, Gimmi Baldinini entered the company. The company has 100 Baldinini stores around the world and employs 250 workers.

In 2001, the group MBFG through its subsidiary Antichi Pellettieri acquired 50% of the company.

In 2007, the company signed with Facco Corporation a contract for the production and commercial distribution of branded jewelry Baldinini.

In 2009, on the occasion of the 120th anniversary of the Eiffel Tower, Baldinini created a feminine sandal that follows the design of Parisian architecture, with a golden platform cage and a vertiginous spire heel, covered in black silk velvet.

In 2015, Baldinini and Mafrat together signed a line dedicated to clothing for children aged 3 to 16 under the supervision of Brand Connection S.r.l., called "Baldinini Young".

In 2016, Baldinini signs a contract with the Visconti maison of Florence for the creation of a collection of pens signed by Baldinini.

The company archive consists of about 3000 pairs of shoes. In collaboration with the University of Bologna, Gimmi Baldinini plans to transform his company assets into a business museum.

See also
 Stefano Bemer
 Bettanin & Venturi

References

Bibliography
 Silvia Martinenghi Baldinini Le scarpe a modo mio – Shoes my way  Artestampa

External links

Baldinini Website
Mariella Burani Site
Football & Soccer Boots

Clothing brands of Italy
Shoe companies of Italy
Clothing companies established in 1910
Italian companies established in 1910
Shoe brands
High fashion brands
Fashion accessory brands
Bags (fashion)
Leather manufacturers